Chapman Field is located in Corpus Christi, TX.  The facility has both a baseball field, home to the Texas A&M–Corpus Christi Islanders baseball team and a softball field, home to the Texas A&M–Corpus Christi Islanders softball team. The facility was renamed after John and Louise Chapman before the beginning of the 2007 baseball season. Whataburger Field is used instead of Chapman Field for some baseball early season tournaments and also some big matchups (i.e. Texas A&M or Rice).

Major renovations to both fields were made in 2011 and 2012.  Renovations included new bleachers, new lighting for baseball, a new field surfaces, new irrigation, new bullpens, as well as windscreens around the fence.  The baseball bleacher system was replaced and the old system was moved to the softball field.

See also
 List of NCAA Division I baseball venues

References

Sports venues in Corpus Christi, Texas
Texas A&M–Corpus Christi Islanders baseball
Texas A&M–Corpus Christi Islanders softball
Baseball venues in Texas
College softball venues in the United States
Southland Conference Baseball Tournament venues
2002 establishments in Texas
Sports venues completed in 2002